Kontrust is an Austrian crossover band formed in 2001. The band is famous for wearing lederhosen and their lyrics are predominantly in English, though German and Slavic languages have also been incorporated into some songs.

History
In 2006 the band won the Austrian Newcomer Award, made their first music video for the song "Phono Sapiens" and played at the freeride- and snowcross-competition Vertical Extreme.

Their second album, Time To Tango, was released on June 19, 2009 in Austria. "The Smash Song" was the first single of the album. Their song "Bomba" landed them a spot in the Dutch charts and was the number one downloaded rock song on the Dutch iTunes Store.

In 2010 Kontrust was awarded with the Amadeus Austrian Music Award (category Hard & Heavy).  They played at the 2011 Przystanek Woodstock and were requested by Jerzy Owsiak to play "Bomba" a second time as an unscheduled encore. According to official information over 300,000 visitors saw Kontrust's performance making it the most attended gig of an Austrian artist up to now.

On May 4, 2012 Kontrust released their 3rd studio album "Second Hand Wonderland" via Napalm Records. The album entered the Austrian charts on May 11 and peaked at number 25, where it remained for a total of two weeks. Singles released of the album included "Sock 'n' Doll", "Butterfly Defect" and "Hey DJ".

On November 7, 2014 Kontrust released their fourth studio album Explositive again via Napalm Records. The album entered the Austrian charts on November 21 and peaked at number 42, where it remained for a total of one week. The first single released of the album was "Just Propaganda" 

In June 2022 the band announced a change in their line-up via their social channels as the new singer Julia Ivanova and drummer Joey Sebald joined the band and replaced Agata and Roman.

Discography

Albums

EPs and Singles

Video

References

External links
 
 Kontrust on myspace

Austrian heavy metal musical groups
Musical groups established in 2001